Clamp is a surname. Notable people with the surname include:

Arthur Clamp (1884–1918), English footballer 
Eddie Clamp (1934–1995), English footballer
Paula Clamp (born 1967), novelist, playwright and Visiting Lecturer at the University of Ulster
Shirley Clamp (born 1973), Swedish pop singer
Steve Clamp (born 1977), British freelance journalist and newsreader
Ted Clamp (1924–1990), English footballer
William Clamp (1891–1917), Scottish Victoria Cross recipient